"Heaven & Hot Rods" is a song by the American alternative rock group Stone Temple Pilots. It is the second single released in support of their album No. 4.

Track listing 
US CD promo single (PRCD9159)
"Heaven & Hot Rods" (Dean DeLeo, Scott Weiland) – 4:33

Release history

Charts

Personnel
Adapted from the Heaven & Hot Rods liner notes.

Stone Temple Pilots
 Dean DeLeo – electric guitar
 Robert DeLeo – bass guitar
 Eric Kretz – drums
 Scott Weiland – lead vocals, organ

Production and additional personnel
 Brendan O'Brien – production, mixing
 Nick DiDia – recording
 Russ Fowler – recording
 Andrew Garver – editing
 Stephen Marcussen – mastering
 Dave Reed – engineering
 Allen Sides – engineering

References

External links 
 Heaven & Hot Rods at Discogs (list of releases)

1999 songs
1999 singles
Stone Temple Pilots songs
Song recordings produced by Brendan O'Brien (record producer)
Songs written by Dean DeLeo
Songs written by Scott Weiland
Atlantic Records singles